The 2005 WDF World Cup was the 15th edition of the WDF World Cup darts tournament, organised by the World Darts Federation. It was held in Perth, Australia.

Men's singles

Women's singles

Other Winners

Final Points Tables

Men

Women

Youth

References

External links
 Results for 2005 World Cup

WDF World Cup darts
2005
WDF World Cup
Darts in Australia
Sport in Perth, Western Australia